Paravibrissina is a genus of flies in the family Tachinidae.

Species
P. adiscalis Shima, 1979
P. argentifera Shima & Tachi, 2008
P. aurigera Shima & Tachi, 2008
P. leucogaster Shima & Tachi, 2008
P. pacifica Shima & Tachi, 2008
P. parvula Shima & Tachi, 2008

References

Exoristinae
Diptera of Asia
Tachinidae genera